Henry E. Frnka (March 16, 1903 – December 18, 1980) was an American football player, coach, and college athletics administrator. He served as the head coach at the University of Tulsa from 1941 to 1945 and at Tulane University from 1946 to 1951, compiling a career college football record of 71–32–5.  Frnka was also the athletic director at Tulsa from 1941 to 1945.

Coaching career

High school
Frnka began his coaching career at the high school level. He served as the head football coach at Lubbock High School in Lubbock, Texas from 1926 to 1930 before moving to Greenville High School in Greenville, Texas in 1931. He led the Greenville Lions to a Texas state championship in 1933. He used the fumblerooski for the very first time in the 1933 Texas High School Championship game.

Vanderbilt
Frank left Greenville in 1936 to become freshman coach at Vanderbilt University. He was briefly succeeded at Greenville by his assistant, Dennis Vinzant.

Tulsa
From 1941 to 1945, Frnka coached at the University of Tulsa, and compiled a 40–9–1 record. The Tulsa Golden Hurricane had never been to a bowl game before, and he took them to five straight, becoming Tulsa's most prolific coach. The Golden Hurricane won three league titles, and outscored opponents 1,552 to 375.  He led the team to their first bowl game and a school-best national ranking of No. 4 at the end of the 1942 season.

Tulane
From 1946 to 1951, Frnka coached at Tulane University, and compiled a 31–23–4 record.  Since the 1920s, the Tulane Green Wave had been a national power in college football, and Frnka-led teams produced records of 9–1 in 1948, 7–2–1 in 1949, and 6–2–1 in 1950.  In a 1949 issue devoted to a preview of that year's college football season, SPORT magazine declared that Tulane was the best team in the country.

Death
Frnka died on December 18, 1980 in San Antonio, Texas at the age of 77.

Head coaching record

College

References

1903 births
1980 deaths
American football halfbacks
Austin Kangaroos football players
Temple Owls football coaches
Tulane Green Wave football coaches
Tulsa Golden Hurricane athletic directors
Tulsa Golden Hurricane football coaches
Vanderbilt Commodores football coaches
High school football coaches in Texas
People from Colorado County, Texas
Players of American football from Texas